Poon Man Tik (born 24 February 1975 in Hong Kong) is a former Hong Kong professional footballer.

Club career
He has played as a defensive midfielder and right-back over his career.

References

External links

1975 births
Living people
Hong Kong footballers
Hong Kong football managers
Association football midfielders
South China AA players
Sun Hei SC players
Happy Valley AA players
Tai Chung FC players
Hong Kong First Division League players
Expatriate footballers in Macau
Hong Kong international footballers
Hong Kong League XI representative players